Stephanie Bukovec (born 22 September 1995) is a footballer who plays as a goalkeeper. Born in Canada, she represented the Croatia women's national team.

Club career
In 2016, she played for Vaughan Azzurri in League1 Ontario. During a League Cup semi-final, after her team went down 2-0 in the first half, she switched to striker, scoring two goals to tie the game, before returning to the goalkeeper position, winning the match in a penalty shootout.

In July 2018, Bukovec signed with Þór/KA in the Icelandic Úrvalsdeild kvenna. She helped the team advance from the 2018–19 UEFA Women's Champions League qualifying round, being named the Group 1's best player after keeping a clean sheet in all three games.

In January 2019, she signed with ŽNK Split of the Croatian Prva HNLŽ. In May 2019, she scored two goals in a 10–0 win against ŽNK Katarina Zrinski after being playing the last 30 minutes as an attacker. She helped Split win the 2019 Croatian championship, breaking the long-term dominance of ŽNK Osijek. In June she led the club to the Croatian Cup with her performance in the Cup Final victory against Osijek.

National team career
Bukovec has been capped for the Croatia national team, appearing for the team during the 2019 FIFA Women's World Cup qualifying cycle.

Personal life
Bukovec's father, Boris, was born in Slovenia, while her mother, Helen, was born in Poland. Her grandmother was from Dalmatia in Croatia. Her older brother Matthew played college basketball, her older sister Natalie played football in college before turning to coaching, and twin sister Sophie played professional beach volleyball.

References

External links
 
 
 
 Stephanie Bukovec Croatia profile

1995 births
Living people
Croatian women's footballers
Croatia women's international footballers
Women's association football goalkeepers
Oakland Golden Grizzlies women's soccer players
Belmont Bruins women's soccer players
Canadian people of Croatian descent
Canadian women's soccer players
AFC Ajax (women) players
Croatian Women's First Football League players
Soccer players from Toronto
ŽNK Split players
Expatriate women's footballers in the Netherlands
Vaughan Azzurri (women) players
Croatian expatriate women's footballers
Canadian expatriate women's soccer players
Canadian expatriate sportspeople in the Netherlands
Croatian expatriate sportspeople in Iceland
Canadian expatriate sportspeople in Iceland
Expatriate women's footballers in Iceland
Canadian people of Slovenian descent
Canadian people of Polish descent
Croatian people of Slovenian descent
Croatian people of Polish descent
Croatian expatriate sportspeople in the United States
Canadian expatriate sportspeople in the United States